Exposed is a program that airs on Tuesdays 13:30 ET on Canadian music television station, MuchMusic. The program focuses on a specific individual music artist or a music group and intends to reveal the real personality of the music artist by documenting a MuchMusic VJ spending time and interacting with them. The show concept is to provide a different view on a celebrity by documenting them offscreen and having good-natured fun with a VJ.

External links 
Exposed Homepage

Much (TV channel) original programming